A pin is a device used for fastening objects or fabrics together and can have three sorts of body: a shaft of a rigid inflexible material meant to be inserted in a slot, groove, or hole (as with pivots, hinges, and jigs); a shaft connected to a head and ending in a sharp tip meant to pierce one or more pieces of soft materials like cloth or paper (the straight or push pin); a single strip of a rigid but flexible material (e.g. a wire) whose length has been folded into parallel prongs in such fashion that the middle length of each curves towards the other so that, when anything is inserted between them, they act as a clamp (e.g. the bobby pin), or two strips of a rigid material bound together by a spring at one end so that, when the spring held open, one can insert some material between the prongs at the other end that, the spring allowed to close, then clamp the inserted material.  According to their function, pins can be made of metals (e.g. steel, copper, or brass), wood, or plastic.

History

Pins have been found at archaeological sites dating as early as the Paleolithic, made of bone and thorn, and at Neolithic, Celtic and Ancient Roman sites.  Neolithic sites are rich in wooden pins, and are still common through Elizabethan times.  Metal pins dating to the Bronze Age have been found in Asia, North Africa and Europe, like the notable hammer-headed pins from the Kurgan burials in the northeastern Caucasus.

Sewing and fashion pins
The development of the pin closely paralleled that of its perforated counterpart, the needle.  Archaeological evidence suggests that curved sewing pins have been used for over four thousand years. Originally, these were fashioned out of iron and bone by the Sumerians and were used to hold clothes together. Later, pins were also used to hold pages of books together by threading the needle through their top corner.

Many later pins were made of brass, a relatively hard and ductile metal that became available during the Bronze Age. This development was followed by the use of steel which was much stronger but tended to rust when exposed to humid air. The development of inexpensive electroplating techniques allowed the steel to be plated with nickel. Nickel did not rust, but tended to flake off the steel in humid weather, again allowing it to rust. However, this took many months or even years to happen, and as nickel plated steel pins were usually used only temporarily to hold fabric in place prior to sewing, no further refinement has been considered necessary.  Note, however, that some modern specialty pins are made out of rust-proof and very strong titanium.

Production
A pinners guild was first established in London in 1356, spreading to other towns, but falling short of the quality produced by French pinmakers, discussed in the Art de l'épinglier (1761) where Henri-Louis Duhamel du Monceau gives details about the division of labor used by French pinmakers:

Adam Smith described the manufacture of pins as part of his discussion about the division of labor in the Wealth of Nations. 

John Ireland Howe invented a pin-making machine in 1832, and an improved machine in 1841; his Howe Manufacturing Company of Derby, Connecticut, used three machines to produce 72,000 pins per day in 1839.

Walter Hunt invented the safety pin by forming an eight-inch brass pin into a bent pin with a spring and guard.  He sold the rights to his invention to pay a debt to a friend, not knowing that he could have made millions of dollars.

Straight pins

General purpose pins
The push pin was invented in 1900 by Edwin Moore and quickly became a success. These pins are also called "map pins" and are distinguished by having an easy to grip head. There is also a new push pin called a "paper cricket".

See also drawing pin or thumb tack.

Steel pins without heads
Thin, hardened pins can be driven into wood with a hammer with the goal of not being seen.

Mechanical fasteners 
In engineering and machine design, a pin is a machine element that secures the position of two or more parts of a machine relative to each other. A large variety of types has been known for a long time; the most commonly used are solid cylindrical pins, solid tapered pins, groove pins, slotted spring pins and spirally coiled spring pins.

 Clevis pin
 Cotter pin
 Slotted pin
 Spiral pin
 Split pin
 Solid pin
 Spring pin

Notes

References

Henry Petroski, The Evolution of Useful Things, Chapter 4. .
Robert Parmley, Standard handbook of fastening and joining. 1st edition. Chapter 2. McGraw-Hill (New York). 1977. 

Fasteners
Textile closures
Sewing equipment